Adrian Dumitru Borza (born 18 February 1985) is a Romanian footballer. He played for Gloria Bistriţa in the 2005–06 Divizia A season.

References

External links
 
 

1985 births
Living people
Romanian footballers
Association football forwards
Liga I players
Liga II players
FC Universitatea Cluj players
ACF Gloria Bistrița players
CSM Deva players
CSM Câmpia Turzii players
ACS Sticla Arieșul Turda players
FC Petrolul Ploiești players
ASA 2013 Târgu Mureș players
Sportspeople from Cluj-Napoca